Slavko Pengov (24 June 1908 – 6 January 1966) was a Slovene painter best known for his monumental opus of murals such as those in the National Assembly Building in Ljubljana and the Parish Church of Saint Martin in Bled.

Pengov was born in Ljubljana in 1908. He studied art at the Zagreb Academy of Fine Arts and the Academy of Fine Arts Vienna. From 1945 he taught at the Academy of Arts in Ljubljana.

He also illustrated a number of books and won the Levstik Award in 1951 for his illustrations of Fran Saleški Finžgar's book Pod svobodnim soncem (Under A Free Sun).

In 1959 he received the Prešeren Award for his murals on the history of Slovenes in the National Assembly Building in Ljubljana.

References

Slovenian male painters
Slovenian illustrators
1908 births
1966 deaths
Artists from Ljubljana
Levstik Award laureates
Prešeren Award laureates
Academy of Fine Arts, University of Zagreb alumni
University of Vienna alumni
Academic staff of the University of Ljubljana
20th-century Slovenian painters
20th-century Slovenian male artists